Orien Brown (born March 4 1952) is a former American sprinter. She won the gold medal in the 4 × 100 metres relay at the 1971 Pan American Games.

Brown competed in college representing Texas Southern University. In 1971, she won the 100 yard dash at the Texas Relays in a wind-aided time of 10.4 seconds.

Brown has coached the track and field teams at Dallas Skyline High School and Bishop Dunne Catholic School. In 2017, she was inducted into the Texas Black Sports Hall of Fame.

References

American female sprinters
Pan American Games medalists in athletics (track and field)
Pan American Games gold medalists for the United States
Athletes (track and field) at the 1971 Pan American Games
1952 births
Texas Southern Tigers women's track and field athletes
Living people
Medalists at the 1971 Pan American Games
20th-century American women